The 1976–77 Serie A season was the 43rd season of the Serie A, the top level of ice hockey in Italy. Seven teams participated in the league, and HC Bolzano won the championship.

First round

Final round

External links
 Season on hockeytime.net

1976–77 in Italian ice hockey
Serie A (ice hockey) seasons
Italy